The 2021 Utah State Aggies football team represented Utah State University in the 2021 NCAA Division I FBS football season. The Aggies were led by first-year head coach Blake Anderson and played their home games at Maverik Stadium. They competed as members of the Mountain Division of the Mountain West Conference. The finished the season 11–3, 6–2 in Mountain West play to win West division to earn a bid in the Mountain West  Championship game. They defeated San Diego State in the championship game to win the Mountain West championship. They received an invitation to the LA Bowl where they defeated Oregon State.

Previous season
In a season limited due to the ongoing COVID-19 pandemic, the Aggies finished the 2020 conference-only season 1–5 to finish in 11th place in Mountain West play. Head coach Gary Andersen was fired after going 0–3 in the first three games. Co-defensive coordinator Frank Maile was named interim head coach. 

The final scheduled game of the season was canceled due to a Utah State player boycott.

Following the season, the school named Arkansas State head coach Blake Anderson the team's new head coach.

Schedule

Source

References

Utah State
Utah State Aggies football seasons
Mountain West Conference football champion seasons
LA Bowl champion seasons
Utah State Aggies football